Pierre Deniger (16 October 1947 – 13 April 1992) was a Liberal party member of the House of Commons of Canada. He was born in Longueuil, Quebec and became a businessman and lawyer by career.

He won the Laprairie electoral district in the 1979 federal election and was re-elected there in 1980. In the 1984 election, Deniger was defeated by Fernand Jourdenais of the Progressive Conservative party. Deniger also lost to Jourdenais in another attempt to win the riding in the 1988 election. He served in the 31st and 32nd Canadian Parliaments.

Electoral Record

External links
 

1947 births
1992 deaths
Members of the House of Commons of Canada from Quebec
Liberal Party of Canada MPs
People from Longueuil